XEWF-AM is a radio station located in Tlalmanalco in the State of Mexico, serving Mexico City. Broadcasting on 540 AM, XEWF is owned by Grupo Radiorama.

History
The history of XEWF begins in Cuernavaca, Morelos, with Fernando Díaz Enríquez receiving a concession for the station on 1420 kHz in that city. After four decades of transmitting from Cuernavaca, XEWF moved in 2004 to Tlalmanalco, east of Mexico City, and changed its frequency to 540 kHz in a bid to become a rimshot serving Mexico City, which comprises 35% of the national radio market.

In October 2006, Radiorama Valle de México began operating the station as ColoRín ColoRadio, targeted at children aged six to twelve. In May 2007, XEUR-AM 1530 and XEWF completed an effective format swap, with XEUR becoming a simulcast of grupera-formatted XEQ-FM 92.9 Ke Buena. The next year, the station broke from XEQ to run its own programming aimed at listeners on the east side of Mexico City; the station has since changed names twice, to "La Mexiquense" and "La Bestia Grupera".

On January 1, 2020, the station began simulcasting XHDL-FM "El Heraldo Radio".

A year later on February 1, 2021, XEWF returns to La Bestia Grupera format, leaving Heraldo Radio only on XHDL-FM.

References

Radio stations in Mexico City